Minecon (alternatively capitalised as MineCon, or MINECON) is an annual interactive livestream and fan convention about the video game Minecraft, hosted by Mojang. The first gathering in 2010 was known as MinecraftCon. The event then went by the Minecon name from 2011 to 2019. The Minecon 2011 convention was held in Las Vegas and celebrated the launch of the game with Minecraft-related discussion panels and gaming areas. The most recent in-person convention, Minecon 2016, held in Anaheim, had 12,000 attendees. Since 2017, Minecon has taken the form of an interactive livestream and, as such, Minecon 2016 was the last in-person convention to bear the Minecon name. The livestream was called Minecon Earth in 2017 and 2018, and was later renamed to Minecon Live in 2019 and Minecraft Live starting in 2020. An attempt at returning to in-person events was prevented due to the COVID-19 pandemic.

Events by year

2010
MinecraftCon 2010 was a gathering of more than 30 people at Bellevue, Washington, on the 31st of August. Markus Persson made an appearance at the meet-up when several requests were made for a community meet-up, so he called on the community to pick no specific venue.

2011
5,000 people attended the first official MineCon convention held in Las Vegas on the 18th of November. The convention focused on celebrating the game's release and hosted Minecraft-related discussion panels, and invited people to play the game with others while at the convention. There were keynote speeches from members of the community, building contests, costume contests and exhibits. One of the many events at MINECON was the "Nether Party", an event for those aged 21 and over, featuring Canadian DJ deadmau5. This event also marked the release of Minecraft 1.0 to the public, officially taking the game out of beta as Notch pulled a giant lever. It was also the first time that Minecraft on the Xbox 360 console was first shown and played outside of the development.

2012
On the 2nd of August 2012, Mojang announced that the 2012 MineCon convention would take place at Disneyland Paris on the 24th and 25th of November. The announcement was made over the social networking platform Twitter when the game's creator, Markus Persson, posted a short trailer revealing the new convention location. The video shows Mojang team members wearing Disney paraphernalia, and Persson comments to lead developer Jens Bergensten, "I think they are trying to tell us something". Joystiq's JC Fletcher said that the site was a "step up" from the first MINECON's location in Las Vegas. The second annual convention was the first held outside of the United States, making it available to European fans who might not have been able to attend the first. It was held in the wake of Minecraft'''s growing popularity as the Xbox 360 version of the game sold 3 million copies. 2012 was also the start of several in-game unofficial MINECONs, notably a Virtual MINECON, which although an unofficial event, was attended by a member of the Mojang Team. Many in-game MINECONs have announced an intent to return with the start of the next MINECON.

The convention in 2012 was attended by 4,500 fans. Mojang made several announcements at the 2012 convention. Details about the 1.5 "Redstone" update were revealed as well as information on the game's modding API.

2013
On the 7th of April 2013, Lydia Winters revealed that MINECON 2013 would be held in the United States. Jens Bergensten later said that it would be on the east coast. On the 27th of June, it was announced on Mojang's YouTube Channel that MINECON 2013 will be held in Orlando, Florida. The website for the Orange County Convention Center had listed MineCon as an upcoming event in November, with an attendance of 7,500, but then removed the event from the web page. Tickets went on sale in three batches each of 2,500 tickets on the 31st of July, and the 2nd and 3rd of August. The first batch of 2,500 tickets was sold out in three seconds, according to Mojang COO Vu Bui. The event took place on 2 and 3 November.

2014 (cancelled)
On the 30th of March 2014, Lydia Winters revealed in a tweet that MINECON 2014 would be held in Europe. However, on the 1st of August 2014, Vu Bui created a blog post, stating that there would be no MineCon 2014, but instead the next MineCon would be in Spring 2015 in London. The fact that this Minecon was cancelled was later used on the Xbox 360, Playstation 3, PlayStation 4, Xbox One, Wii U, and Nintendo Switch "legacy console" edition tips as "Nobody remembers where Minecon 2014 was held."

2015

On the 2nd of February 2015, Vu Bui announced MINECON 2015 would be held in London, at the ExCeL London Exhibition and Conference Centre on the 4th and 5th of July 2015. Ticket prices were announced on the 18th of March 2015 and were set at £129. During the opening ceremony on the 4th of July 2015, animated by Element Animation Studios, it was announced by Guinness World Records that MineCon had won the world record for the most attendance for a convention that is solely for one game, selling 10,000 tickets.

2016
On the 7th of March 2016, Mojang announced in a blog post that MINECON 2016 would be held in Anaheim, California, at the Anaheim Convention Center on the 24th and 25th of September 2016. They announced new features during that time, such as the Minecraft novel, Minecraft: The Island, and an update coming to the console versions of the game. promoted in the opening and closing ceremonies a two-part short film from Element Aniamtion, entitled A Minecraft Adventure.

2017
On the 8th of August 2017, Mojang announced that MINECON would be taking the form of an interactive livestream on the 18th of November 2017, dubbed "MINECON Earth". The host of MINECON Earth is Will Arnett, a Canadian actor. After this announcement came the introduction of 'Official Community Events', which allow events such as Minefaire, Minevention and Multiplay's BlockFest to be considered 'Official Minecraft Conventions'.
During MINECON Earth, developers announced the next major update, the "Update Aquatic"; this update was released in July 2018. Vu Bui, COO of Mojang Studios, also announced the winning mob based on a community vote: "The Monster of The Night Skies", later named the "phantom".

2018
On the 10th of April 2018, Mojang announced that MINECON Earth would be taking place on the 29th of September 2018 for 90 minutes on stream. During the event, Mojang announced Minecraft Dungeons, a dungeon-crawler spin-off of Minecraft, and features of the upcoming "Village & Pillage" update, which was released in April 2019. Viewers voted for one of three in-game biomes to be updated in the next update; the Taiga biome won the vote.

 2019 
On the 17th of May 2019, MINECON Live 2019 was announced to be held on the 28th of September that same year, changing the name of the event from "MINECON Earth" to "MINECON Live" to avoid confusion with their new game Minecraft Earth. Like the previous year, viewers were able to vote for new features to be added to one of three in-game biomes in a following update; the Mountains biome won the vote. During the livestream, developers of the game announced the "Nether Update", and "Village & Pillage" update, the latter promoted via a Mojang and Element Animation Studios collaboratory episode of Villager News starring Dan Lloyd. An early access release date of Minecraft Earth was also announced to be for October 2019.

 2020 
Minecraft Live 2020 was held on the 3rd of October 2020. It included a mob vote, where users could vote about which Minecraft creature should be added into the next update. The three options were Iceologer (featured in Minecraft Dungeons), Moobloom (featured in the game Minecraft Earth) and Glow Squid, with the Glow Squid winning. The livestream also provided details on Minecraft's next big update, "Caves & Cliffs", and a musical "Nether Update Encore" from Element Animation Studios promoting the present version of the game.

 2021 
Minecraft Live 2021 was held on the 16th of October 2021. It featured a live mob vote, like previous years, with the options consisting of the Copper Golem, the Glare, and the Allay, the last of which won the vote, as well as another Element Animation Studios musical short film opening the event, describing the features of the previous "The Caves & Cliffs Update Part 1" in song form. The show also announced the theme of the next major update, called "The Wild Update", which added a new biome, the mangrove forest, and an underground biome called the Deep Dark, which was originally planned for the, "Caves & Cliffs Update: Part 2".

 2022 
Minecraft Live 2022 was held on the 15th of October 2022. It featured an in-game mob vote, unlike previous years, with the options consisting of the Sniffer, the Rascal, and the Tuff Golem, the first of which won the vote. It also announced some basic features for the next update, 1.20, including camels, bamboo wood, and hanging signs. It also announced the basic gameplay for the upcoming game Minecraft Legends and the Season 3 update for Minecraft Dungeons''.

Minecraft Festival 
A return to the convention format was announced at Minecon Live 2019, named Minecraft Festival, which would happen in September 2020, after three years of hosting livestreamed-only events. Minecraft Festival's venue, the Orange County Convention Center in Orlando, Florida, would have been the same venue for Minecon 2013. More details were revealed at the very start of the COVID-19 pandemic, but was swiftly postponed a week later to the same dates in 2021, then to an undetermined date in 2022, and then cancelled for 2022 as the pandemic continued throughout 2021 and 2022.

References

External links 

 

Annual events
Recurring events established in 2010
Video game conventions
Minecraft